The 449th Combat Aviation Brigade is a Combat Aviation Brigade of the North Carolina National Guard based in North Carolina.

The unit was formed on 1 October 1987 as the Aviation Group Headquarters, 18th Airborne Corps.

History

The unit deployed to Camp Taji during September 2017 as part of Operation Inherent Resolve and Operation Spartan Shield and included the following units:
 1st Battalion (Attack Reconnaissance), 244th Aviation Regiment
 248th Aviation Support Battalion
 17th Cavalry Regiment
 2nd Squadron
 7th Squadron
 4th Battalion (Attack Reconnaissance), 4th Aviation Regiment
 229th Aviation Regiment
 B Company
 227th Aviation Regiment
 F Company
 1st Battalion (General Support), 126th Aviation Regiment
 Elements of 2nd Battalion (Airfield Operations), 130th Aviation Regiment
 Elements of 1st Battalion (General Support), 189th Aviation Regiment

Structure
Units:

 Headquarters and Headquarters Company
 1st Battalion (General Support) 126th Aviation Regiment
 Company B
 Detachment 2
 Company C
 Detachment 2
 1st Battalion (Attack Reconnaissance), 130th Aviation Regiment
 2nd Battalion (Airfield Operations), 130th Aviation Regiment
 1st Battalion (Assault Helicopter), 131st Aviation Regiment
 Company C
 Detachment 17 (Joint Operational Support Airlift Center)
 2nd Battalion, 151st Aviation Regiment
 Company B
 Detachment 1
 638th Aviation Support Battalion
 Company B
 Detachment 1
 677th Engineer Detachment (Firefighting Tactial Group (FFTG))
 430th Engineer Detachment (FFTG)

References

External links
 Center of Military History, Lineage and Honors
 
 Official DVIDS page

Military units and formations in North Carolina
Aviation Brigades of the United States Army